Frisch's Big Boy is a regional Big Boy restaurant chain with headquarters in Cincinnati, Ohio. For many years a Big Boy franchisee, in 2001, Frisch's became the exclusive owner of the Big Boy trademark in Indiana, Kentucky, and most of Ohio and Tennessee, and is no longer affiliated with Big Boy Restaurant Group. In July 2022, there were 84 restaurants in Indiana, Kentucky, and Ohio. This includes 11 Big Boy stores in Cincinnati, 6 in Dayton, Ohio, and 3 in Louisville, Kentucky. Frisch's is the oldest, longest surviving regional Big Boy operator, excluding Bob's Big Boy in California, which was the original Big Boy restaurant and franchisor.

Leadership of Frisch's passed from founder David Frisch to his son-in-law and finally his grandson, until 2015, when the company was sold to Atlanta-based NRD Capital, an equity fund which focuses on restaurant development. Frisch's also previously owned numerous Golden Corral restaurants in Indiana, Kentucky, Ohio, Pennsylvania, and West Virginia but after closing six under-performing stores in 2011, Frisch's sold the remainder in March 2012.

History

Before Big Boy
In 1905, Samuel Frisch opened the Frisch Cafe in Cincinnati, Ohio. Five years later he closed the café and moved to the Norwood suburb of Cincinnati soon opening another café there. Success brought a new building in 1915 for the restaurant then known as Frisch's Stag Lunch. When the elder Frisch died in 1923, three of his sons, David, Reuben and Irving, continued operating the cafe; twenty-year-old Dave took his father's lead role.

In 1932, Dave Frisch sold his interest in Stag Lunch and opened his own Frisch's Café. Frisch's Café was a success and in 1938 a second location opened, this one across from the Stag Lunch in Norwood. However, Frisch couldn't meet expenses of the Norwood restaurant and facing bankruptcy, both cafés closed in 1938. Fred Cornuelle, a local businessman counseled Frisch and provided money for a new restaurant. In 1939 the Mainliner opened on Wooster Pike in Fairfax, Ohio. Cincinnati's first year-round drive-in restaurant, it was named after a passenger airplane that flew into nearby Lunken Airport. By 1944 a second Frisch's restaurant opened, designed to resemble George Washington's Mount Vernon home.

Becoming a Big Boy franchise

Immediately after World War II, Dave Frisch visited one of Bob Wian's Big Boy restaurants in California. Although he was unable to meet Wian, Frisch was impressed with the double-deck Big Boy hamburger and recognized the efficiency of two thinner beef patties cooking faster than a single thicker patty.

Unknown to Dave Frisch, Bob Wian was disturbed by drive-in operators outside California using the Big Boy name and hamburger without permission. To maintain national trademark protection, Wian needed his Big Boy restaurants to operate in other regions of the U.S. When the two men later met, Wian offered Frisch a sweetheart deal of $1 per year for a four-state territory. The territory included the Cincinnati tri-state region of Ohio, Kentucky and Indiana and added Florida to increase Big Boy's national span. Frisch accepted and became the first Big Boy franchisee.

Being the first franchisee, an ad hoc arrangement allowed Dave Frisch unique freedoms. His double-deck Big Boy hamburger was slightly different than Wian's. Dave Frisch also created his own Big Boy character: a thinner boy with reddish or blond hair, wearing striped rather than checkered overalls, presented in a running or skipping pose. Known as the East Coast Big Boy, this mark represented Frisch's and its licensees Manners and Azar's through 1969. Most Frisch's Big Boy restaurants still display statues from this design, albeit usually repainted with brown hair and checkered overalls. In 2017 a redesigned statue resembling the West Coast Big Boy was introduced.

Dave Frisch began selling Big Boy hamburgers in 1946 at Frisch's Mainliner Drive-In. After forging a licensing agreement with Bob Wian in 1947, the first Frisch's Big Boy Drive-In restaurant, Big Boy One, opened on Central Parkway north of downtown Cincinnati.

Expansion

David Frisch opened three more Big Boy Drive–In Restaurants in 1949 – including the first in Kentucky – and opened his fifth drive–in the following year. By 1954 Frisch's operated 20 units in Greater Cincinnati and was subfranchising Big Boys elsewhere. In 1953 and 1954 Frisch's subfranchised Azar's Big Boy in Ft. Wayne, Indiana, and Manners Big Boy in the Cleveland, Ohio TV market. In 1955, Frisch's subfranchised northwest Ohio to Toledo brothers Milton and David Bennett, to operate under the Frisch's Big Boy name. By the fall of 1961 upwards of 150 drive–ins were in service by Frisch's and its franchisees.

In 1960, 1966 and 1969 Frisch's licensed three Elby's Big Boys in the upper Ohio Valley area of Ohio. After the death of Dave Frisch, a fourth Ohio Elby's Big Boy prepared to open in 1971, but Frisch's unexpectedly demanded much higher fees for the unit. In response, Elby's cancelled all ties to Frisch's and operated independently of Big Boy in Ohio, including in direct competition to Frisch's in the Columbus market. Protracted litigation followed as Frisch's sued Elby's  and eventually Shoney's for operating non-Big Boy restaurants in Frisch's Big Boy territory, while operating Big Boys in neighboring states. Overall, the lawsuits were unsuccessful and both Elby's and Shoney's dropped Big Boy affiliation completely in 1984.

In 1972, Frisch's purchased Kip's Big Boy which covered Texas, Oklahoma and areas of Kansas. In 1988, in exchange for allowing Elias Brothers to operate (former Elby's and Manner's) Big Boys in Ohio, Frisch's received Big Boy rights in parts of Tennessee and Georgia. Frisch's ended Kip's operations in 1991, and sold that territory as well as Georgia and Florida to Big Boy Restaurants International in 2001.

Frisch's released its branded tartar sauce to local grocery stores in 1960. Frisch's faced competition from numerous restaurants, both national and local. The Cincinnati McDonald's restaurants introduced the Filet-O-Fish in 1963 in an aggressive campaign against Frisch's.

David Frisch died in 1970, and his son-in law, Jack C. Maier was elected president and chairman of the board. When Maier retired in 1989, his son Craig F. Maier became president and CEO.

Influence on other franchisees
Larry Hatch, founder of Eat'n Park Restaurants in Pittsburgh, observed the Frisch's drive-in operation in 1948 in Cincinnati. Hatch was very impressed and quickly contacted Bob Wian about opening a Big Boy drive-in in Pittsburgh; Eat'n Park opened in 1949 as the second Big Boy franchisee. Eat'n Park chose not to renew its Big Boy franchise agreement in 1975.

Alex Schoenbaum, founder of Shoney's (originally known as Parkette Drive-In) became close friends with Dave Frisch. Frisch prompted Schoenbaum to become the Big Boy franchisee for West Virginia and introduced him to Bob Wian. The original artwork for the Parkette used the Frisch "East Coast" Big Boy character, and print advertisements for Parkette would switch off, using both designs through 1954. Shoney's eventually grew into Frisch's territorial boundaries causing Shoney's to drop Big Boy affiliation in 1984.

Both Eat'n Park and Shoney's, early Big Boy franchisees, continue in operation today.

Frisch's created the "Brawny Lad" and "Swiss Miss" sandwiches which were added to the menus of most other Big Boy franchisees. The chopped sirloin sandwiches are distinctive for being served on rye buns. Frisch's "Filet de Sole" fish sandwich was also widely adopted by other Big Boy franchises. Where Bob Wian called a sandwich with french fries and salad item a "combination plate", Frisch's began calling it a "platter" such as a Big Boy Platter, followed by several other Big Boy chains.

Recent history
In 1983, Frisch's introduced drive-thru service at many restaurants, although carhops were retained at a few Cincinnati locations. It added the soup and salad bar, and also remodeled, or demolished and completely rebuilt, older units. Frisch's closed their locations in Florida and all Kip's locations by the 1990s.

In September 2018, Frisch's operated 95 Big Boy restaurants and franchises 23 to other Big Boy operators. Eleven of the franchised restaurants—those located in northwestern Ohio—are owned and operated by Bennett Enterprises.

Big Boy trademark ownership
In 2000, Frisch's had the opportunity to purchase the national Big Boy chain, which was in bankruptcy, but declined the offer. Instead Robert Liggett purchased the national chain. Early the following year, Liggett's operation, renamed Big Boy Restaurants International made a deal with Frisch's, paying $1.2 million for Frisch's territories in Florida, Georgia, Texas, Oklahoma and Kansas, and granting Frisch's perpetual ownership of the Big Boy mark in remaining territories. The bankruptcy threatened Frisch's right to operate and franchise Big Boy restaurants but was forever resolved by the separation. The separation also relieved tensions for Big Boy, who charged other franchisees royalties and licensing fees that Frisch's was exempt from. Frisch's franchise agreement with Bob Wian, which had no expiration, required a trivial $1 per year licensing fee.

Sale of Frisch's Restaurants
On August 24, 2015, Frisch's was sold to an Atlanta-based private equity fund. The new owner, an affiliate of National Restaurant Development (NRD) Partners, paid approximately $175 million to purchase outstanding shares of Frisch's stock.

The sale ended family operation and ownership of the Frisch's restaurant chain. Craig Maier, CEO and his sister Karen Maier, vice president of marketing, grandchildren of founder David Frisch, retired from the company. However, both will remain active as franchisees, operating individual Frisch's Big Boy Restaurants. Other family members were not involved or were too young and expressed no interest in continuing the greater Frisch's legacy.

On September 4, 2015, Frisch's Restaurants, Inc. ceased to be a listed, publicly traded company. Aziz Hashim, CEO of NRD Partners, assumed Craig Maier's position as Frisch's president. In April 2016, Jason Vaughn was hired as CEO.

This was not the first dealing between the two organizations. In 2012, Frisch's tentatively sold its 29 remaining Golden Corral restaurants to NRD Holdings, the parent of NRD Partners. Golden Corral blocked the sale and repurchased the units instead.

NRD Partners plan to expand Frisch's presence in existing and smaller markets—including expanding statewide in Indiana, Kentucky, and Ohio outside of Greater Cleveland (which is served by Big Boy Restaurants International) while enjoying its Big Boy rights in Tennessee by expanding into that state, including Nashville.

Absent since closing its last downtown Cincinnati restaurant in 2004, Frisch's returned in June 2018, opening a Big Boy restaurant on the ground floor of the Carew Tower.

Coke and Pepsi 
Frisch's was known for its "cherry" and "vanilla" Coke but switched to Pepsi products in December 2013. Frisch's cited a better deal from Pepsi, and deemed taste tests adding the same vanilla and cherry flavorings to fountain Pepsi acceptable. However, the change stirred numerous protests at Frisch's Facebook page from customers unhappy with the loss of Coke. Frisch's noted that Toledo area franchised stores have served Pepsi for "a number of years". Big Boy Restaurants International previously switched from Coke to Pepsi in 2001, similarly citing a "great, interesting proposal" by Pepsi. Frisch's new owners were aware of the controversy, and in June 2018, CEO Jason Vaughn announced that Coca-Cola was returning to Frisch's Big Boy restaurants by September. Coca-Cola reappeared at Frisch's Mainliner restaurant on July 27, 2018, with other stores to follow. Cincinnati Reds catcher Tucker Barnhart was on hand to pour the first Coke at 11 am.

New statue 
In March 2017, Frisch's unveiled a restyled statue. The new statue resembles the original West Coast design with black pompadour hair and Big Boy hamburger hoisted atop one arm. The checkered outfit, however, is replaced with striped overalls including slingshot as used on the original East Coast Big Boy. Now displaying a healthy torso, the Big Boy's black and white saddle shoes are replaced with cap toed sneakers. The debut statue (wearing a Cincinnati Reds uniform) is placed at the Great American Ball Park; another is planned for an unnamed Frisch's restaurant. Frisch's will then swap the new statues for existing restaurant statues in need of repair.

Cincinnati Reds
For several decades, Frisch's has had a business relationship with the Cincinnati Reds baseball organization. From 1983 to 1998, Frisch's was a part owner of the ball club as a silent partner to majority owner Marge Schott, including their World Series win in 1990.

Two Frisch's Big Boy concession stands opened in 2013 at Cincinnati's Great American Ball Park. An East Coast Big Boy statue repainted with a Cincinnati Reds uniform was placed near one stand, and in March 2017, the first of the redesigned Frisch's statues, likewise in Reds uniform, was added.

Frisch's Big Boy hamburger

The Big Boy served at Frisch's is slightly different than those at other Big Boy restaurants. Where Bob Wian dressed Big Boy hamburgers with mayonnaise and red relish, Frisch later replaced these with tartar sauce and added dill pickles in his version and applied these in a different order. (Early Frisch's menus show that he used tartar sauce on hamburgers and cheeseburgers, but mayonnaise on his Big Boy hamburgers.) Frisch's licensee Manners Big Boy used a different tartar sauce called "white sauce" and placed the pickles above the top patty. The use of tartar sauce on Frisch's Big Boy hamburgers wasn't simply a matter of taste. Frisch recognized the use of a single combined condiment was simpler and faster. Later the Big Boy system adopted the idea, using the combined form of red relish and mayonnaise, commonly known as thousand island dressing, on Big Boy hamburgers.

Commercials and slogans
In earlier years, Frisch's adaptation of the Big Boy caricature was slimmer, had blond hair topped with a cook's cap, cartoon-like eyes, slightly cherubic facial features, and wore striped pants instead of the traditional checkered bib overall-type pants used by Bob's Big Boy. In the late 1960s both characters were redrawn incorporating common elements such as checkered pants and brown hair. This Frisch's Big Boy graphic was drawn with the pompadour and lost the cook's cap but otherwise the facial features remain the same as in the 1950s. This allowed Frisch's existing fiberglass statues to continue in use, with hair and overalls repainted. It is the typical statue displayed at Frisch's today, though several units use the West Coast Bob's Big Boy statue. In 2016 and 2017 a new design and statue were introduced.

Through the 1970s, Frisch's personalized the Big Boy slogan, "Frisch's Has So Much More" similarly adapting it for the Frisch's owned, Kip's Big Boy restaurant chain in Texas, Oklahoma and Kansas.

In the mid-1980s, Marriott planned to retire the Big Boy character. As a publicity scheme, Marriott launched a "Should Big Boy Stay or Go?" campaign, asking customers at Frisch's and other Big Boy franchises to vote on whether or not the Big Boy should continue to be used for the trademark. Customers overwhelmingly voted that Big Boy should stay.

Slogan's used by Frisch's included, but were not limited to:

"Frisch's Has So Much More" (1970s; Big Boy chain slogan)
"Gotta be Frisch's Big Boy! Oh what a value!" (early 1980s)
"For me!" (early 1980s)
"Nobody takes care of you like Big Boy" (1980s; Big Boy chain slogan)
"America loves its Big Boy" (late 1980s; Big Boy chain slogan)
"Frisch's starts with better stuff" (1990s)
"What's Your Favorite Thing?"® (current)
"Good Fun. Great Food. Friendly Faces." (current)
"Home of Burgers, Breakfast, & Big Boy." (current)

A classic Frisch's jingle used on both Radio & TV in the 1960s went:

See also 
 List of hamburger restaurants
 List of casual dining restaurant chains
 List of franchises

Notes

References

External links
 
 

Big Boy Restaurants
Restaurants in Cincinnati
Companies based in Cincinnati
Economy of the Midwestern United States
Regional restaurant chains in the United States
Restaurants established in 1939
Cuisine of Cincinnati